Chauncey Bulkley (January 16, 1798 – May 23, 1860) was an American lawyer, businessman, and politician.

He was born in Wethersfield, Connecticut, being the son of Francis Bulkley of that town, and a descendant of Rev. Peter Bulkley of Concord, Massachusetts. After graduating from Yale University in 1817, he taught a school in Philadelphia, for about a year, and then for three years he was an instructor in Mount Airy College, in Germantown, Pennsylvania. He studied law with Charles Chauncey, Esq., of Philadelphia, was admitted to the bar May 20, 1822, and resided in that city engaged in practice. In 1832 and 1833 he was Secretary and Treasurer of the Germantown and Norristown Railroad Co. From 1845 to 1850 he was one of the Aldermen of the city of Philadelphia. After this he resumed his professional practice and continued it till his death.  He died in Philadelphia, aged 62.

1798 births
1860 deaths
People from Wethersfield, Connecticut
Yale University alumni
Pennsylvania lawyers
19th-century American lawyers